Johanna Wilhelmina Petronella Damman, known under her nickname Jomanda (born May 5, 1948), is a controversial Dutch healing medium who refers to herself as the Lady of the light.

Background
Born Johanna Wilhelmina Petronella Damman in Deventer, Jomanda is a Dutch spiritualist who described herself as being "a healing medium." She claims to have psychic powers of clairvoyance, empathy and prescience, aided by her late father and other powers from the "world divine". She is known to be a devoted fan of paranormal author Jozef Rulof.

Career
In 1991, she gained national fame after making an appearance on a popular talk show. In the next decade, she held public gatherings in Tiel where she announced that she would be performing healings, which drew large groups of people. During these sessions she would 'infuse' bottles of tap water, which she claimed would make them gain healing properties. She also appeared on radio shows, where people were asked to put a bottle of water in front of their radio in order to have it remotely 'infused'.

Controversy
In 2001 Jomanda gave medical and spiritual advice to the popular Dutch actress Sylvia Millecam, who later died of cancer. In 2004 the Dutch Health Inspectorate filed suit against Jomanda claiming that she and three alternative therapists misled Millecam by claiming that the actress was merely suffering from an inflammation. In October 2006, the investigation was dropped, but in April 2008 an Amsterdam court ruled that Jomanda and two doctors who practise alternative therapies should be prosecuted for their roles in Millecam's death.
The trial started at 30 October 2008. On 12 May 2009 Ronald ter Heegde, Jomanda's former assistant, admitted on television in the Dutch newsmagazine Nova that Jomanda had used other persons to gather information about Sylvia Millecam. She then told Millecam she had gathered this information as a medium. On 12 June 2009 the court found Jomanda not guilty as a party to Millecam's death. The court criticised her actions, but stated that she could not be held fully responsible for Millecam's fate.

The Dutch Federation Against Quacks (Nederlandse Vereniging tegen de Kwakzalverij) listed Jomanda as #15 on their top 20 list of quacks.

In October 2004 Jomanda drew publicity again by stating, in accordance with the ideas of Jozef Rulof, 'Cremation hurts'.

See also

Arthur Ford
Char Margolis
Clever Hans
Cold reading
Forer effect 
Hot reading
James Pike
John Edward
Jozef Rulof
Mirin Dajo
Peter Hurkos
Peter Popoff
Uri Geller

References

External links

King Solomon Seals

1948 births
Living people
Dutch psychics
New Age spiritual leaders
People acquitted of manslaughter
People from Deventer
People from Tiel
Spiritualists
Supernatural healing